Sundanese traditional house refers to the traditional vernacular houses of Sundanese people predominantly inhabited Western parts of Java island (West Java and Banten provinces), Indonesia. The architecture of a Sundanese house is characterized by its functionality, simplicity, modesty, uniformity with a little details, its use of natural thatched materials, and its quite faithful adherence to the harmony with the nature and environment.

Form and materials

The Sundanese traditionally maintain the knowledge of their ancestors and their traditional lifestyles in a close harmony with nature, which extends to their construction methods; using local materials of timber, stone, bamboo, thatched materials and palm leaves.

Sundanese traditional houses mostly take basic form of gable roofed structure, commonly called kampung style roof, made of thatched materials (ijuk black aren fibers, hateup leaves or palm leaves) covering wooden frames and beams, woven bamboo walls, and its structure is built on short stilts. Its roof variations might includes hip and gablet roof (combination of gable and hip roof).

The more elaborate overhanging gablet roof is called julang ngapak, which means "bird spreading wings". Other traditional Sundanese house forms including Buka Pongpok, Capit Gunting, Jubleg Nangkub, Badak Heuay, Tagog Anjing, and Perahu Kemureb. The ornamentation commonly includes the "o" or "x" shaped roof edges that called capit gunting, which is very similar to a certain "x" design of Malay houses' roof.

Next to houses, rice barn or called leuit in Sundanese, is also an essential structure in traditional Sundanese agricultural community. Leuit is especially important during Seren Taun harvest ceremony.

Layout
Compared to Javanese houses, Dayak longhouses or Minangkabau houses, Sundanese traditional houses are much smaller with only consists of three parts or rooms for a single nuclear family. A more traditional house of Baduy people, a sub-ethnic of Sundanese people is called Sulah Nyanda. It is commonly regarded as the blue print of common Sundanese traditional houses. It is made from wooden frame, woven bamboo wall, and dried palm leaves roof.

The traditional house of Sulah Nyanda is divided into three parts; sosoro (front), tepas (middle) and imah (rear) rooms. Each room functions according to the family requirements.

The veranda-like front of the house or commonly called sosoro serves as a guests' reception area. This is because guests are usually not allowed to get into the house. Other functions including a place to relax and weave for women. The front is shaped to the side with an opening gap as the entrance.

The middle room is called tepas, used for sleeping quarter and family meetings. While at the back of the house or commonly called as imah used as a place to cook and store the produce of fields especially rice. Each room is equipped with holes on the floor for air circulation.

History
The architecture of Sundanese house reflects the culture of Sundanese people. Unlike its Javanese neighbor which adhere to such social hierarchy reflected in the stratification of roof types in their houses, Sundanese houses are more egalitarian with a touch of uniformity; the common similarly designed small-sized houses clustered together in their kampung (village). This layout can be found in numbers of Sundanese traditional villages. 

The houses of Baduy people is the example of traditional Sundanese architecture that still strictly adheres to traditional life, rules and taboos. Baduy people are well known for their hermit-like self-imposed isolationism which rejects modern way of life and outside influences. For example, it is forbidden for them to apply masonry technique, such as using earthenware or terracotta tiles for roof, nor using bricks, sand and cements as building materials. It is also forbidden for them to excessively altering the terrain or leveling the topography.

The example of Sundanese traditional houses can be found in numbers of Sundanese traditional villages. Such as Kampung Naga in Tasikmalaya Regency, Kampung Ciptagelar on the southern slopes of Mount Halimun, Sukabumi Regency, Kampung Urug and Kampung Sindang Barang in Bogor Regency.

After the era of Javanese expansion during Sultan Agung of Mataram era in 17th century, Sundanese began to adopt Javanese architectural themes more extensively. Thus the limasan, joglo, and tajug pyramidal roof more commonly appeared in Sundanese settlements and principalities. Nevertheless, traditional Sundanese 
architecture still commonly abundant in rural Western Java.

The era of European colonialism of VOC and Dutch East Indies after 17th century brought European architectural techniques, including stone and brick masonry. There were gradual adaptation started in this era to create a colonial architecture in Preanger. Yet, the architectural influence went both ways, as numbers of colonial architecture began to adopt native architecture including Sundanese traditional styles. The Halls of Tecnische Hogeschool in Bandung, now Bandung Institute of Technology, designed by Henri Maclaine Pont, has its roof inspired by vernacular architecture of Indonesia, with influences possibly derived from Batak Karo house, Minangkabau Atap Bagonjong of Rumah Gadang, to Sundanese Julang Ngapak roof.

Today, there is a steady decline of traditional Sundanese houses, as modern families began to adopt and construct houses in modern style and techniques. More concrete masonry houses were erected in Sundanese cultural area, and those of truly traditional wooden and bamboo structure, with thatched roofed Sundanese houses, were only left in rural areas.

See also

 Indonesian architecture
 Rumah adat
 Dutch Indies country houses

References

Further reading

 

Rumah adat
Sundanese culture
House types